An enzyme inducer is a type of drug that increases the metabolic activity of an enzyme either by binding to the  enzyme and activating it, or by increasing the expression of the gene coding for the enzyme.  It is the opposite of an enzyme repressor.

See also 
 Enzyme activator
 Enzyme inhibitor
 Regulation of gene expression

References

External links
 Hepatic enzyme inducers
 Hepatic enzyme inhibitors

Medicinal chemistry
Enzymes
Metabolism